The 2010 Italian Formula Three Championship was the 46th Italian Formula Three Championship season. The season began on 24 April at Misano and ended on 24 October at Monza after 16 races held at eight meetings.

With victories at Hockenheim, Vallelunga and Monza, César Ramos of BVM – Target Racing finished the season as champion, becoming only the fifth non-Italian driver to win the title. He finished eight points clear of Lucidi Motors driver Stéphane Richelmi, who won four races during the season. Third place went to Prema Junior's Andrea Caldarelli, who took two victories at Mugello as well as the season-opening round at Misano. Ramos, Richelmi and Caldarelli each earned a Formula One test with Scuderia Ferrari, as well as a test in a Formula Renault 3.5 Series car. Fourth place in the championship was claimed by Team Ghinzani's Daniel Mancinelli who won races at Hockenheim and Imola, while fifth went to triple race-winner Sergio Campana, the team-mate of Richelmi. Jesse Krohn took the other race victory at Varano for RP Motorsport.

Teams and drivers
 All cars were powered by FPT engines, and ran on Kumho tyres. All teams were Italian-registered.

Calendar

Standings
Points were awarded as follows:

References

External links
 Official Website

Italian Formula Three Championship seasons
Formula Three
Italy
Italian Formula 3 Championship